Nyva Bershad is a Ukrainian football club and currently competes in the Vinnytsia Oblast Football League is from Bershad, Vinnytsia Oblast.

History

From 1996 the team competed in the Vinnytsia Oblast Football League replacing FC Sportinvest Kryvyi Rih. In the 1996–97 the club entered the Ukrainian Second League and during this period becomes a farm club for Nyva Vinnytsia. However, by the start of the 1998–99 plays only 4 matches and removes itself from the competition and returns to the amateur competition.

The club returns to the Ukrainian Second League for the 2004–05 season. In the next season the club takes over the place of Nyva Vinnytsia in 2005–06 season. The club competes until the 29th Round and then it withdraws.

The club reorganized itself and return to the Vinnytsia Oblast Football League where it competes now.

{|class="wikitable"
|-bgcolor="#efefef"
|Year
|Name
|-
|1996–2004
|Nyva Bershad
|-
|2004–2006
|FC Bershad
|-
|2006–current
|Nyva Bershad
|}

League and cup history

{|class="wikitable"
|-bgcolor="#efefef"
! Season
! Div.
! Pos.
! Pl.
! W
! D
! L
! GS
! GA
! P
!Domestic Cup
!colspan=2|Europe
!Notes
|-  	
|align=center|1996–97
|align=center|3rd "A"
|align=center|9
|align=center|30
|align=center|11
|align=center|6
|align=center|13
|align=center|31
|align=center|36
|align=center|39
|align=center|1/64 finals
|align=center|
|align=center|
|align=center|
|-  	
|align=center|1997–98
|align=center|3rd "B"
|align=center|13
|align=center|32
|align=center|9
|align=center|8
|align=center|15
|align=center|39
|align=center|46
|align=center|35
|align=center|1/128 finals
|align=center|
|align=center|
|align=center|
|-
|-  	
|align=center|1998–99
|align=center|3rd "B"
|align=center|16
|align=center|0
|align=center|0
|align=center|0
|align=center|0
|align=center|0
|align=center|0
|align=center|0
|align=center|
|align=center|
|align=center|
|align=center bgcolor=pink|Withdrew
|-
|align=center|1999–2004
|align=center colspan=13|Club competes in the Oblast League
|-
|align=center|2004–05
|align=center|3rd "A"
|align=center|5
|align=center|28
|align=center|14
|align=center|7
|align=center|7
|align=center|33
|align=center|21
|align=center|49
|align=center|1/32 finals
|align=center|
|align=center|
|align=center bgcolor=green|Promoted
|-
|align=center|2005–06
|align=center|2nd
|align=center|18
|align=center|34
|align=center|3
|align=center|4
|align=center|27
|align=center|14
|align=center|60
|align=center|4
|align=center|1/32 finals
|align=center|
|align=center|
|align=center bgcolor=pink|−9 – Withdraw
|}

References

External links
 Official website

 
Nyva Bershad
Nyva Bershad
Bershad
Agrarian association football clubs in Ukraine